The Fauves are an Australian rock band formed in 1988. The band are known for their witty lyrics, melodic pop-rock and often satirical or evocative exploration of Australian themes.

Their album Future Spa was nominated for Best Alternative Album in the 1997 ARIA awards but lost to Spiderbait's Ivy and the Big Apples. They played at the Big Day Out in both 1993 and 1997.

In 2007, they played their 1,000th Show and in 2008 they celebrated their 20th Anniversary Gig at The Espy in Melbourne.

History

The Fauves were formed in 1988 by four students of Mt Eliza High School, Mornington Peninsula. They were Andrew Cox on guitar and vocals; Andrew "Jack" Dyer on bass guitar; Philip Leonard on guitar, vocals and brass; and Adam Newey on drums. According to Australian musicologist, Ian McFarlane, they "took their name from the short-lived French art movement, Fauvism, which was characterised by both its intensity and infatuation with colour." Neither Cox nor Leonard had formal music lessons.

Their first gig was on 23 July 1988, at a local football club, Cox later recalled "We learnt more about rock ‘n’ roll in that one night than the entire preceding 20 years. We sucked piss, made eyes at the cheap football tarts and bonded like four buckets of superglue. We also learnt how to compromise, how to sell out, and how to get fucked over. There was no rider, we were underpaid and no one got laid. It was a microcosm of an entire career." McFarlane declared that the group's "early sound was an energetic distillation of garage-punk rock riffs and surreal lyrics."

In March 1990, the band released their debut five-track extended play, This Mood Has Passed, on Timbertop Records. It had been recorded in the previous year at Timbertop Studios, Ringwood, with Peter Carrodus producing. McFarlane felt the EP "reflected the frantic, primal elements of early Hunters & Collectors or Moodists." They followed in October with a 7" single, "Fireman 451", on Shock Records, produced by Doug Saunders.

In 1991, they issued two singles, "When Luck Ran Out" and "Daughter Aboard". In the following year two EPs, both with six-tracks, were issued on Shock Records, The Scissors Within (April) and Tight White Ballhugger (September), each was produced by Robbie Rowlands. The EPs "kept up the experimental energy and humour." In 1992 the Fauves featured on a split CD, Dress Ups (Shock Records), with other Melbourne bands The Glory Box and Pray TV with each band performing a track from the others' repertoire, as well as contributing one original track.

Nic Haygarth of The Canberra Times caught their gig in October 1992, he found "the bald heads of [Dyer] and [Leonard] give them a fiercer appearance, but nothing could be friendlier than the melody of 'Fracture in the Sky' and Leonard's trumpet on their best track 'Wilding'. The Fauves played strong material from The Scissors Within and quirky new stuff from latest EP Tight White Ballhugger, including mandolin tempered 'Archimedes' Crown'. Doomy distorted guitars powered their set, but the Fauves nearly lost their audience with a couple of extended thrash routines which not even the Brady Bunch theme could redeem."

During a gig at Sydney's Annandale Hotel late in 1992 "they detoured into a freeform noise epic during which Cox washed Newey's hair with Vegemite and shampoo." The Ages Craig Mathieson described their support slot on the Church's national tour, "They rehearsed extensively, mindful of the opportunity they had been given. The result? Church fans ignored them."

The band came to wider attention when they appeared on the bill of the first Big Day Out tour in January 1993. They signed to Polydor Records and, in October of that year, they released their debut long player, Drive Through Charisma. It was produced by Rowlands, who had them "recorded in a mud-brick house in Daylesford." The original version included a 22-track bonus disc featuring early demos and some live songs, which Mathieson felt were "often horrendous early recordings." It was accompanied by a separate booklet, "22 Reasons Why a Band Shouldn't Put an Album Out in Its First Few Years", written by Newey who provided critical analysis for each track: Mathieson noticed he "ridiculed every song."

The 1994 computer game Quarantine featured the band's song "The Driver Is You" on its soundtrack.   Their second album The Young Need Discipline was released in 1994.  In 1995 the band released a non-album single "Everybody's Getting a 3 Piece Together". The song was later included on the band's next album as a secret track.

The Fauves's most successful album to date Future Spa was released in July 1996. The album yielded considerable radio success with singles "Dogs Are The Best People" and "Self Abuser" coming in at No. 20 and No. 30 respectively in the Triple J Hottest 100, 1996. Between the release of Future Spa and their album Lazy Highways, the band were filmed for Vanessa Stuart's one-hour documentary, The Fauves: 15 Minutes to Rock, which has since aired on SBS and was also screened at the Document Film Festival in October 2004.

By the end of 1999, however the band was dropped from Polydor after the label's merger with Universal. Following their departure from the major label, the band wrote two songs, "Bigger Than Tina" and "Bigger Than Tina II", for the Australian movie Bigger Than Tina which were released as a single on Festival. Since then the group has released seven albums independently. They had further success on the Triple J Hottest 100 with "Bigger Than Tina" at No. 50 in 1999, and "Give Up Your Day Job" at No. 58 in 2000.

The Fauves released their ninth studio album, When Good Times Go Good, on 6 September 2008. It was recorded with longtime collaborator Wayne Connolly, who has worked on five of the band's nine albums, and co-produced by Jim Moginie from Midnight Oil. A video-clip was made of the "Underwhelmed".

After a three-year break the band debuted tracks from their tenth album Japanese Engines on 10 November 2011 in Geelong. The album was followed only five months later by an eight-track EP German Engines launched at The Toff in Town. Andrew Cox announced on stage: "Japanese Engines was kind of the poppier record. German Engines has a much darker soul, it's a bit heavier, it's a bit rougher."

A double album, titled Driveway Heart Attack, was released in 2019, their 12th studio album.

In July 2022, the band headlined a Melbourne show. The press releases labeled it "“last show till the next one”,  the “first show since the last one.”

Discography

Albums

Compilations

Extended plays

References

External links

The Fauves – official site
The Fauves fansite – features a comprehensive bio, rare videos, mp3s, press clippings, and more
Webcuts – Essay on "Everybody's Getting a Three Piece together" and interview with Andrew Cox
The Fauves, dBmagazine

Musical groups established in 1988
Australian rock music groups
Victoria (Australia) musical groups